The Eugene Masonic Cemetery, the oldest chartered cemetery in Eugene, Oregon, is one of the oldest privately owned and continuously operating historic entities in Lane County. It was incorporated as a burial site in 1859, the same year Oregon became a state. As was the custom at the time, the Eugene City fathers asked a local fraternal organization—in this case, the Freemasons—to establish a city "bury ground" open to all. The Masons purchased ten acres on a knoll about two miles from the town center and laid out the cemetery with its main entrance at what is now the intersection of University Street and 25th Avenue.

In 1994, cemetery ownership passed from the Masons to the non-profit Eugene Masonic Cemetery Association, whose board members are volunteers. The EMCA retains "Masonic" in the cemetery's name as an important historic reference, but it is no longer officially affiliated with Freemasonry. The cemetery contains Hope Abbey Mausoleum which, together with the cemetery itself, was placed on the National Register of Historic Places in 1980.

History
The cemetery was established on a treeless hill in the country outside Eugene. For many years it was one of the principal resting places chosen for Eugene's prominent citizens, a number of whom are listed below. Through many generations and in varying conditions, it was managed by the local Masonic Lodge, but eventually the load became too much, and the site, overrun by weeds and blackberries and subject to vandalism, became a matter of public concern. The City of Eugene, with coöperation from the Masonic lodge, began a  process that resulted in transfer of  ownership to a new Eugene Masonic Cemetery Association (EMCA).

The Association's immediate goal was to reverse generations of neglect, and its primary aim remains the rehabilitation and interpretation of this historic resource. Since 1994, the EMCA has largely restored the native and heritage landscape of the cemetery. Over $300,000 has been invested in the rehabilitation and improvement of Hope Abbey Mausoleum and the repair of hundreds of damaged historic tombstones. The goal of historic interpretation has resulted in production of a book, Full of Life, numerous brochures and over 50 interpretive signs on site. These and many other improvements have transformed the cemetery from an urban disaster to an urban amenity.

The site
Originally treeless and, like the valley floor,  covered with prairie grasses and wildflowers, the cemetery is now dominated by a mature stand of Douglas-fir trees, together with a wide variety of understory species. One of the EMCA's first acts was the development of a landscape plan, which emphasized the cultivation of native plants—more than 100 native species of plants can be found in the cemetery—and the preservation of the site's unique qualities as an island of tranquility in an urban setting. In 2006, the Eugene Tree Foundation presented its award for excellence in stewardship of an urban forest to the EMCA. Mowing is limited, to allow the native plants to flourish and provide an uninterrupted display, as well as to protect ground-nesting birds.

The cemetery was initially platted in a formal grid with streets and alleys. Numerous family plots, measuring 20×20 feet and subdivided into ten lots, were purchased by pioneer subscribers for $15 apiece. Over the years, the Eugene Masonic Cemetery has remained an active cemetery, and even today a limited number of in-ground burial spaces are still available. Two scatter gardens for burial of cremated remains have been created, and three Jewish sections of the cemetery have been defined and consecrated.

Over fifty historic markers describing notable early and recent notable Eugeneans are maintained near gravesites. An on-site bulletin board is provided, with informational brochures, including maps for walking tours, and Hope Abbey is a venue for occasional lectures and musical performances.

Hope Abbey

Hope Abbey is a mausoleum that was designed in the Egyptian Revival style by Ellis F. Lawrence and dedicated in 1914.  Its distinctive architecture includes a massive entrance archway, with lotus blossom urns and bundles of papyrus on either side of the copper-clad doors. Details include ancient Egyptian symbols above the entrance: the circular disc representing the sun, twin cobras denoting death, and vulture wings symbolizing protection and maternal care. The history of the mausoleum has been extensively researched and has been used to guide its rehabilitation after years of neglect. It was placed on the National Register of Historic Places in 1980.

Hope Abbey Mausoleum was dedicated on June 14, 1914 at the southwest corner of the Eugene Masonic Cemetery, which itself was founded in 1859 by Masonic Lodge #11 at the request of the city. Over the years, both the cemetery and the mausoleum had been vandalized repeatedly, and Masonic Lodge #11 did not have the resources for the upkeep of the cemetery or Hope Abbey. In 1995, with the active assistance of the City of Eugene, ownership of the cemetery, including Hope Abbey, was turned over to the Eugene Masonic Cemetery Association (EMCA), a non-profit organization, whose Board of Directors members are volunteers.

Since 1995, Hope Abbey has been largely rehabilitated and updated. A new roof, proper drainage, a wheelchair-accessible front porch, electrical service and a working lavatory are among the improvements. The eighty glass clerestory windows that had been bricked up as protection against vandalism have been reopened and reproduction stained glass windows by local glass artisan John Rose allow sunlight to once again illuminate the interior. Additional work, including extensive marble repair and replacement, as well as structural repairs, has continued as funds have permitted.

Hope Abbey, with crypts and niches still available for purchase, is normally kept secure and locked, but the huge doors are opened to the public from 1 to 4 p.m. on the last Sunday of each month except December, as well as on special occasions such as Memorial Day weekend or for musical events, including the summer Music To Die For series.

People
City founder Eugene Skinner and Oregon's first governor, John Whiteaker, are buried here, as are many Civil War veterans. More recent burials include those of 20th century radio personality Carolyn Spector and  blues disc jockey "Rooster" Gavin Fox. Notables include mayor Ruth Bascom, as well as presidents of both the University of Oregon and Northwest Christian College. Names from prominent local families such as Chambers, Friendly, Condon, Luckey, Collier, McCornack, and Kerns pepper the hillside. An extensive, searchable list of burials is available on the EMCA website.

Hope Abbey also contains the remains of a number of prominent members of the Eugene business, academic and professional communities, some of whom are listed in the book Full of Life, published by the EMCA and downloadable from the cemetery website.

Organization
The Eugene Masonic Cemetery Association is a non-profit 501(c)(3) organization with a Board of Directors, a Cemetery Administrator and a Site Manager. Money raised for the restoration and operation of the cemetery totals well over one million dollars. Both a general endowment and a landscape endowment have been established. Work is also accomplished through matching grants, in-kind business contributions, pro bono professional help, and a vast number of volunteer hours. It is the largest cemetery restoration project in Oregon and is considered a model throughout the state.

References

External links

 Official website (includes an extensively researched account of the cemetery's history, with information about notable burials there.)
 Hope Abbey Mausoleum

Cemeteries on the National Register of Historic Places in Oregon
National Register of Historic Places in Eugene, Oregon
Protected areas of Lane County, Oregon
Geography of Eugene, Oregon
Tourist attractions in Eugene, Oregon
1859 establishments in Oregon
Freemasonry in the United States
Masonic cemeteries
Cemeteries established in the 1850s